E3 ubiquitin-protein ligase SIAH2 is an enzyme that in humans is encoded by the SIAH2 gene.

Function 

This gene encodes a protein that is a member of the seven in absentia homolog (SIAH) family. The protein is an E3 ligase and is involved in ubiquitination and proteasome-mediated degradation of specific proteins. The activity of this ubiquitin ligase has been implicated in regulating cellular response to hypoxia.

Interactions 

SIAH2 has been shown to interact with PEG10, Synaptophysin, PEG3 and VAV1.

References

Further reading